Rickett is a surname. Notable people with the surname include:

Arthur Compton-Rickett (1869–1937), English author and editor
Harold Rickett (1909–1969), English rower who competed at the 1932 Summer Olympics
Horace Rickett (1912–1989), English footballer
Joseph Compton-Rickett (1847–1919), Liberal Party politician in England
Sophy Rickett (born 1970), visual artist, working with photography and video/sound installation
Thomas Rickett, creator of the Rickett (car) in 1860, a steam-powered car from Buckingham, England
W. Allyn Rickett, American historian
Walter Rickett (1917–1991), professional footballer who played as a winger
William Rickett or William Ricketts (1898–1993), Australian potter and sculptor of the arts and crafts movement

See also
Racket (disambiguation)
Rackett
Rickets
Ricketts (disambiguation)
Rocket